Richard Daniel Burnett (October 8, 1883 – January 23, 1977) was an American folk musician and songwriter from Kentucky.

Burnett was born near Monticello, Kentucky.  Blind for most of his life, he was a full-time travelling entertainer. With fiddler Leonard Rutherford he formed a long touring partnership, and a brief recording career in which they sang a number of popular and influential sides with Burnett on banjo or guitar.

Burnett has been described as "one of the great natural songsters, a man who collected, codified, and transmitted some of our best traditional songs. Dick was also a skilful composer and folk poet of considerable skill; his "Man of Constant Sorrow" remains one of the most evocative country songs."

Early life
Burnett was born in the area around the head of Elk Springs about seven miles north of Monticello. He remembered little of his farming parents. His father died when he was only four and his mother died when he was twelve.  Burnett did say that his mother told him how his father would carry him in his arms when he was only four years old and he would help his dad sing. Burnett's grandparents were of German and English descent and that particular ancestral influence would be instrumental in forming Burnett's musical career. At the age of seven, Burnett was playing the dulcimer; at nine he was playing the banjo, and at thirteen he had learned to play the fiddle. Unusually for the time, he also learned the guitar, which was still a novelty in that area.

As a teenager, then as a married man with a child, Dick Burnett worked extensively as a wheat thresher, logger, oil driller and oilfield tool fitter. Then in 1907 he sustained a gunshot explosion in his face while fighting off a mugger. Surgeons were unable to save his eyesight, so he resorted to supporting himself and his family by his music.  Almost prophetically, his boss made the following statement to Burnett: "Well, you can still make it; you can make it with your music.

Musicians in Wayne County could elicit small change from audiences drawn from people frequenting or passing through the Monticello Courthouse Square. To earn a proper income, Dick was forced to travel to as many different places as he could reach by train or on foot. At other courthouses, at rail stations and on street corners, he would perform to attract a crowd. While other street musicians might place a hat on the ground, he accepted contributions in a tin cup tied to his leg.

Even before he lost his sight, he had sought to enlarge his repertoire by composing his own songs. He felt that he had "learned the rudiments of music" by virtue of attending five singing schools and studying one book "up to where I could compose my own songs, set the music to it, and time it out". With this confidence, he composed more and more songs, which increased his earning power in two ways: they added novelty to his performance; and he could earn extra by selling the lyrics. For the most part he had individual song lyrics printed on cards he called "ballets", but occasionally he compiled songbooks such as his 1913 compilation of six songs. Some of these were from other singers, dealing with disasters such as the sinking of the Titanic and the wreck of the FFV but two were notably personal: the autobiographical Song of the Orphan Boy, which was later recorded but not released, and the semi-autobiographical Farewell Song, with its opening line "I am a man of constant sorrow". Burnett himself never recorded the song, but his friend Emry Arthur learned it and recorded it accompanied his brother Henry using the opening line as title. The Arthur family lived in Wayne County not far from Monticello, and shared many songs with Burnett. He recalled learning one song from a ballet card from a third brother Sam. He acquired more ballets by exchanges with other blind musicians he met on his travels. Having learned the tune by listening, he would have the lyrics read to him until he had learned the whole song.

To add further variety to his increasingly rich repertoire, Dick Burnett purchased novelty gadgets that made non-musical noises. These sounds, together with shouts and dance calls, added an element of extrovert showmanship to his performances, which he described as "monkey business".

Burnett and Rutherford
In around 1914, Burnett proposed to solve the problem of travelling as a blind man by employing teenaged Leonard Rutherford as sighted companion. Their first trip together was to the nearby Laurel County Fair, then young Leonard spent more and more time with the older man, becoming a permanent companion when his parents died. Burnett was not his only music teacher; he learned from other South Kentucky fiddlers, including the African American Cuje Bertram. But playing with Dick made him a professional musician, and from him he learned the old style of playing in unison with the banjo.  As his fiddling improved, it became profitable to range further afield by horse bus and railroad. Eventually Burnett bought a car, which Rutherford learned to drive, thus allowing  them to travel in Burnett's words "from Cincinnati to Chattanooga" playing "every town this side of Nashville".

They traveled by bus, Model A, and on foot to any place they could and sing. From about 1914 until 1950, the pair became so popular that they found themselves in the company of most all the popular mountain musicians of the time. They were "at home" in the presence of the Carter Family, Charlie Oaks, Arthur Smith and many others. They appeared at the Renfro Valley Barn Dance, on radio stations in Cincinnati, and finally, they would be some of the first old-time musicians to enter the recording studios.
 
One particularly profitable area for them was the coal fields of Virginia. It was in Bonny Blue Coal Camp, Virginia, in 1926, that they encountered a general store owner specialising in phonograph records, who recommended them to Columbia records.

In 1926 the country music sector of the recording industry was on the point of expansion. Columbia Records had started its dedicated 3500-D series 1924 for the Old Familiar Tunes country market, without many authentic southern performers. But Columbia had some success with groups such as the north Georgia Skillet Lickers, the Virginia Blue Ridge Highballers and the band of North Carolina Charlie Poole. Columbia's A&R manager Frank Walker was prepared to record more southern musicians, and invited Burnett and Rutherford to a November "field recording" session in November at a temporary studio in Atlanta.

At this first session Burnett and Rutherford recorded six sides, which were issued in 1927 as three 78 rpm records and sold very well. Country Music historian Charles Wolfe considers that the success of these records encouraged Frank Walker to shift Columbia's emphasis from studio singers such as Vernon Dalhart to authentic southern artists. The best seller of the three with Lost John A-side sold 37,600 copies in three years, an astonishing figure for that market at the time. Profitable as the records were for Columbia, Dick and Leonard received only sixty dollars per side and their expenses.

Dick Burnett did find a way to profit from their records. He bought many copies wholesale from Columbia and sold them at his performances, just as he had previously sold his ballets and songbooks.

Burnett and Rutherford were invited to the Columbia's next Atlanta sessions in April and November 1927. The ten numbers included Dicks' autobiographical Song Of The Orphan Boy, which was not issued, a record with two sides of dance tunes without a vocal (enlivened by Dick's "monkey business" in the form of kazoo and jew's harp imitations), and a version of Hesitation Blues backed by Dick's adaptation of the well-known Danville Girl. Another blues, All Night Long was backed by the ballad Wilie Moore, which was reissued on the influential 1952 Harry Smith Anthology of American Folk Music, thus introducing Burnett and Rutherford to the new market of the American folk music revival.

The next year, dissatisfied with their payment  they broke from Columbia and recorded with Gennett Records. This involved travel to the Northern recording studio, but Gennett's base in Richmond, Indiana was more accessible from Kentucky  than those of other Northern record companies. Newly partnered with guitarist Byrd Moore, they recorded five sides in October 1928. One of these was rejected, so Cumberland Gap was issued with a reverse recorded by Burnett and Moore with another fiddler, Charles Taylor.

Recording details 
Click on a label to change the sorting.

References

External links
 1001tunes.com
 

American folk musicians
Songwriters from Kentucky
1883 births
1977 deaths
Gennett Records artists
People from Wayne County, Kentucky
Folk musicians from Kentucky